Redpoint is a small settlement in the north west of Highland, Scotland. It takes its name from Red Point, a low promontory to the south, which marks a turn in the coastline from facing west to south east as it becomes Loch Torridon.

A path leading from the road leads to a viewpoint from which it is possible (on a clear day) to see almost all of the north eastern coast of the Isle of Skye.

The villages of South Erradale, Opinan and Port Henderson are north along the B8056 coast road.

Scottish electronic music band Boards of Canada released the album Geogaddi in 2002 that contains the track "The Beach at Redpoint".

Populated places in Ross and Cromarty
Headlands of Scotland
Torridon
Landforms of Highland (council area)